LeVaughn Kelly Campbell (born July 23, 1980 in Atlanta, Georgia) is a  former football wide receiver. He was signed by the Minnesota Vikings as an undrafted free agent in 2002. He played high school football at Mays High School in Atlanta, and college football at Georgia Tech.

Campbell has also been a member of the Miami Dolphins and Tampa Bay Buccaneers.

Professional career

Minnesota Vikings
Campbell was signed by the Minnesota Vikings as an undrafted free agent in April 2002. He made the team out of training camp, and went on to appear in six games including two starts for the Vikings during his rookie season despite spending some time on the practice squad. He accumulated 13 catches for 176 yards and three touchdowns on the year.

Campbell started six of the 15 games in which he appeared in 2003. He went on to have the best season of his career, catching 25 catches for 522 yards and four touchdowns. He also carried the ball 10 times for 71 yards and returned five kickoffs for 101 yards. In 2004, Campbell appeared in all 16 games of the regular season for the first time in his career. He started three games and on the year caught 19 catches for 364 yards and a score. He also returned 35 kickoffs for 760 yards.

Miami Dolphins
After spending 2005 out of the NFL, Campbell worked out for the Miami Dolphins in January 2006. He was signed by the team in March and given a chance to earn the team's No. 3 receiver job behind starters Chris Chambers and Marty Booker. However, a quadriceps injury hurt his chances to impress the coaching staff, and after an injury settlement with the team was reached Campbell was released.

Despite a new head coach in Miami, Campbell was re-signed by the team on March 8, 2007. However, he was let go on July 6, before training camp opened.

Edmonton Eskimos
On June 2, 2008, Campbell signed with the Edmonton Eskimos. Campbell led the CFL with a 22.6 yards per reception average and he caught 54 passes for 1,223 yards and scoring seven touchdowns.

Tampa Bay Buccaneers
On January 9, 2009, Campbell signed a one-year contract with the Tampa Bay Buccaneers. He was placed on the IR in August of that year and then later released on October 20, 2009.

Edmonton Eskimos
Campbell reportedly signed a multi-year contract with the Eskimos at the end of the 2009 CFL season.
On June 11, 2010, it was announced that Campbell had rejoined the team and would report to training camp.

References

External links
Georgia Tech Yellow Jackets bio
Edmonton Eskimos bio

1980 births
Living people
Players of American football from Atlanta
Players of Canadian football from Atlanta
American football wide receivers
Canadian football wide receivers
Georgia Tech Yellow Jackets football players
Minnesota Vikings players
Miami Dolphins players
Edmonton Elks players
Tampa Bay Buccaneers players